This is a list of television channels in Pakistan. There are a variety of Pakistani television channels that offer viewers the chance to enjoy their favorite shows and stay up to date with current news and events. Television in Pakistan was introduced in 1964.

Current channels

Entertainment

Urdu

 A-Plus Entertainment
 Aaj Entertainment
 Apna Entertainment
 ATV
 AAN TV
 ARY Digital
 ARY Zindagi
 BOL Entertainment (HD)
 Dunya Entertainment
 Express Entertainment
 Filmazia
 Geo Entertainment
 Geo Kahani
 Green TV
 Hum TV (HD)
 Hum Sitaray
 LTN Family
 Play Entertainment
 PTV Home
 PTV Global
 PTV National
 SAB TV Pakistan
 TV One
 Urdu 1

Sindhi

 Awaz TV
 Dharti TV
 Kashish
 KTN
 Sindh TV

Pashto

 Aruj TV
 AVT Khyber
 Hum Pashto 1

Balochi

 PTV Bolan

Saraiki

 Waseb

Kashmiri/Pothohari

 AJK TV

Movies

Urdu
 FilmWorld
 Filmazia

English

 Filmax

Religious

 ARY Qtv
 Haq TV
 Labbaik TV 
 Madani Channel
 Paigham TV
 Peace TV Urdu

News

Urdu news

 24 News HD
 92 News
 Aaj News
 Abb Takk News
 ARY News
 BOL News
 Capital TV
 Channel 5
 City 41
 City 42
 Dawn News
 Dunya News
 Express News
 Geo News
 Geo Tez
 GNN
 GTV News
 Hum News
 Koh-e-Noor
 Lahore News
 News One (Pakistani TV channel)
 PTV News
 Public News
 Rohi
 Samaa TV
 SUCH TV

Sindhi news

 Awami Awaz TV
 KTN News
 Sindh TV News

Pushto news

 Khyber News
 Mashriq TV

Balochi news

 VSH News

English news

 BBC South Asia
 CNN International South Asia
 DW News
 PTV World

Sports

 A Sports HD
 Geo Super
 PTV Sports
 Ten Sports Pakistan

Children's

 Baby TV
 Cartoon Network
 Kids Zone
 MiniMax
 Nickelodeon
 Pop
 Planet Fun

Music

 8XM
 ARY Musik
 Jalwa TV

Food

 Hum Masala

Tourism

 Discover Pakistan TV

Infotainment

 Animal Planet
 Discovery Channel
 National Geographic Channel

Education

 PTV Teleschool

Former channels

Entertainment

Urdu

 Channel 3 (previously known as Shalimar Television Network, replaced by ATV in 2005)
 Filmazia Entertainment (name changed to LTN Family)
 Hum 2 (replaced by Hum Sitaray)
 Indus Plus (replaced by Indus News)
 Network Television Marketing (Pakistan's first fully private television channel) (Shutdown in 1999)
 PTV Prime (changed its name to Prime TV Asia)
 PTV Two (name changed to PTV World in 1998)
 Shalimar Television Network (previously known as PTN, than changed its name to Channel 3 in 2000, replaced by ATV in 2005)
 The Pakistani Channel (changed its name to ARY Digital)
 TVOne Global (changed its name to TV One (Pakistan))

English
 HBO Pakistan (closed in October 2020 & Replaced by A Sports by ARY)

News

Urdu news

 ARY One World (changed its name to ARY News)
 Business Plus (shut down in 2018)
 CNBC Pakistan (replaced by Jaag TV and Jaag TV changed to GNN)
 Indus News (shut down in 2012, than an English language news channel)
 PTV World (returned in 2012, now an English language news channel)
 Aap News (shut down in 2020).

English news

 Dawn News (shifted to Urdu Programming)
 Express 24/7 (changed its name to Tribune 24/7, replaced by Express Entertainment)
 Geo English (replaced by Geo Tez)
 Indus News (Shut down on 14 September 2021)
 Tribune 24/7 (previously known as Express 24/7, replaced by Express Entertainment)

Music

 Aag TV (replaced by Geo Kahani)
 MTV Pakistan (replaced by Indus Music)
 Play TV (Pakistan) (replaced by Play Max, now known as Play Entertainment)
 VH1 Pakistan (shut down in 2009)
 Oxygene TV (shut down in July 2021)

Food
 ARY Zauq (replaced by ARY Zindagi)
 Health TV (replaced by H Now Entertainment)
 Masala TV (changed its name to Hum Masala)

Fashion
 Style 360 (replaced by Hum 2, now Hum Sitaray)

See also 
 List of music channels in Pakistan
 List of news channels in Pakistan

References

External links
  
 List of TV channels in Pakistan
 Media Monitoring & Research in Pakistan
 Pakistan DTH channel list
 Pakistani Television Channels List